Jean Gebser (August 20, 1905 as Hans Karl Hermann Rudolph Gebser – May 14, 1973) was a Swiss philosopher, linguist, and poet who described the structures of human consciousness.

Biography
Born Hans Karl Hermann Rudolph Gebser in Posen in Imperial Germany (now Poland), he left Germany in 1929, living for a time in Italy and then in France. He then moved to Spain, mastered the Spanish language in a few months and entered the Spanish Civil Service where he rose to become a senior official in the Spanish Ministry of Education. His father was lawyer Frederich Gebser and mother was Margaretha Grundmann. Cousin of World War 1 era chancellor Theobald Von Bethmann Hollweg.

Before the Spanish Civil War began, he moved to Paris, and then to Southern France. It was here that he changed his German first name "Hans" to the French "Jean." He lived in Paris for a while but saw the unavoidability of a German invasion. He fled to Switzerland in 1939, escaping only hours before the border was closed. He spent the rest of his life near Bern, where he did most of his writing. Even late in life, Gebser travelled widely in India, the Far East, and the Americas, and wrote half a dozen more books. He was also a published poet.

Gebser died in Wabern bei Bern on May 14, 1973 "with a soft and knowing smile." His personal letters and publications are held at the Gebser Archives at the University of Oklahoma History of Science Collections, Norman, Oklahoma, Bizzel Libraries.

Consciousness in transition
Gebser's major thesis was that human consciousness is in transition, and that these transitions are "mutations" and not continuous. These jumps or transformations involve structural changes in both mind and body. Gebser held that previous consciousness structures continue to operate parallel to the emergent structure.

Consciousness is "presence", or "being present":

Each consciousness structure eventually becomes deficient, and is replaced by a following structure. The stress and chaos in Europe from 1914 to 1945 were the symptoms of a structure of consciousness that was at the end of its effectiveness, and which heralded the birth of a new form of consciousness. The first evidence he witnessed was in the novel use of language and literature. He modified this position in 1943 so as to include the changes which were occurring in the arts and sciences at that time.

His thesis of the failure of one structure of consciousness alongside the emergence of a new one led him to inquire as to whether such had not occurred before.  His work, Ursprung und Gegenwart is the result of that inquiry. It was published in various editions from 1949 to 1953, and translated into English as The Ever-Present Origin. Working from the historical evidence of almost every major field, (e.g., poetry, music, visual arts, architecture, philosophy, religion, physics and the other natural sciences, etc.) Gebser saw traces of the emergence (which he called "efficiency") and collapse ("deficiency") of various structures of consciousness throughout history.

The structures of consciousness
Gebser distinguished the following structures:
 The archaic structure
 The magic structure
 The mythical structure
 The mental structure
 The integral structure

The archaic structure
The archaic structure is the first structure of consciousness to emerge from the "ever-present origin":

No direct information on this structure is available; it is inferred from writings from later times. It is zero-dimensional; consciousness is only "a dimly lit mist devoid of shadows". It is not individual, but "was totally identical with the whole":

The magic structure
In the magical structure events, objects and persons are magically related. Symbols and statues do not just represent those events, objects and persons, but are those same objects and persons.
Gebser symbolizes this "one-dimensional" consciousness structure by the space-less, time-less "point". Unlike the archaic structure in which there is a "perfect identity of man and universe", man is aware of nature as something within his community to which it must "listen" and out of which it must act in order to survive.

The mythical structure
Gebser symbolizes the "two-dimensional" mythical structure by the circle and cyclical time, based on man's discovery of the rhythmic recurrence of natural events and of his inner reflections on his experience of those events. "...[W]hereas the distinguishing characteristic of the magic structure was the emergent awareness of nature, the essential characteristic of the mythical structure is the emergent awareness of soul." In the mythical structure events, objects and persons are woven together in stories. Mythologies give coherence to consciousness. An important element in myth is polarity; the etymology of myth itself implies both speaking (mouth, mythos) and silence (mute). Gebser explains that polarity makes myth particularly foreign to the mental consciousness structure: "Only when we acknowledge both meanings of the root can we discern the fundamental nature of the mythical structure. Only when taken together as an elemental ambivalence, and not a rational contradiction, are they constitutive for the mythical structure." "Only a mental world requires laws; the mythical world, secure in the polarity, neither knows nor needs them."

The mental structure
The mental structure appropriates events, objects and persons by the use of logic. In its efficient form, the mental structure is "three-dimensional". Gebser symbolizes it with the "triangle", which illustrates a "trinity" of thesis, antithesis, and synthesis: "the base of the triangle with its two points lying in opposition represents the dual contraries or antinomies which are unified at the point or apex." For Gebser, this is the essence of "the emergence of directed or discursive thought" with which Western science would be built. "It required centuries to sufficiently devitalize and demythologize the word so that it was able to express distinct concepts freed from the wealth of imagery, as well as to reach the rationalistic extreme where the word, once a power [magic] and later an image [myth], was degraded to a mere formula."

The deficient form of the mental structure Gebser called the 'rational' structure. The rational structure of awareness seeks to deny the other structures with its claim that humans are exclusively rational.

The rational structure is known for its extremes as evidenced in various "nothing but..." statements.  Extreme materialism claims that "everything is nothing but matter — atoms".  Philosophy, the love of wisdom, is replaced with instrumental reason, the ability "to make".  Contemplation—looking inward—is devalued in relation to what one "can do".  "Wise men" fall out of favor and are replaced by the "man of action."  Successes in technologically re-shaping matter offer solutions to some problems but also give rise to problems of their own making.  Mechanized slaughter of two world wars and the new atomic weapons exemplified and symbolized the expression of the ontology of the rational/mental structure.  Living becomes hard to bear in such a consciousness structure.

Some saw the cause of this despair as a lack of values or ethics.  Gebser saw that it is the very consciousness structure itself which has played out to its inherent end.  He saw that its metaphysical presumptions necessarily led to this ethical dead end.  A "value-free" ontology like materialism leads of necessity to living "without value".  Any attempt to remedy the situation by a return to "values" would ultimately fail.  But it was through this very quagmire of "the decline of the West" that Gebser saw the emergence of a new structure of consciousness which he termed the integral.

The integral structure
The integral consciousness structure was made evident by a new relationship to space and time.  In the second part of his work, Gebser set out to document the evidence that he saw throughout various human endeavors.  Of note here were the incorporation of time in physics, the attempts to "paint" time in the visual arts and the like.  Gebser noticed that the integral structure of consciousness was largely witnessed as the irruption of time into the "fixed-reality" of the mental structure.  For Gebser, dualistically opposed and "static" categories of Being gave way to transparency.

Transparency points to how it is that the one is "given-through" and always "along-with" the other.  For centuries, time was viewed as having distinct categories of past, present and future.  These categories were said to be wholly distinct one from the other.  Of course, this created all kinds of difficulties regarding how beings moved from one category to the other — from present to past, for example.  What integral awareness notices is that though we may utilize categorical thinking for various purposes, we also have the realization that time is an indivisible whole.  That various beings in the present are crystallized from the past, and which also extend into the future.  In fact, without already having an integral awareness, one could have no notion of time as "past" or "present", etc.  Without the awareness of the whole, one would be stuck in a kind of "not-knowing" of an always only "now" not connected to any sense of past or future.  Even the mental awareness which divides this whole into distinct categories could not have become aware of those categories without an awareness which was already integral. Thus, awareness is already integral.

Gebser introduced the notion of presentiation which means to make something present through transparency. An aspect of integral awareness is the presentation, or "making present", of the various structures of awareness.  Rather than allowing only one (rational) structure to be valid, all structures are recognized, presented, one through the other. This awareness of and acceptance of the various structures enables one to live through the various structures rather than to be subjected to them ("lived by" them in German).

To realize the various structures within one's language and habits, and even within one's own life and self is a difficult task.  But Gebser says that it is a task that we cannot choose to ignore without losing ourselves.  This means that our so-called "objective thinking" is not without consequences, is not innocent.  That to live "objectively" means to give life to the horrors of nihilism combined with the know how of highly "efficient" weapons.  It means that "objectivity" gets applied to "engineering humanity" whether it is in the behavioral sciences or the physical sciences.  He asks of us whether or not we have had our fill of those horrors yet.  Are we willing to settle into the comfort of our daily life or to take on the process of change?  He offers as a guiding note that just as there is also a time to act, there is also the much neglected time of contemplation.  In a world where know-how is overvalued, simple knowing must also be nurtured.  Furthermore, he knew that thought was never simply a mental exercise restricted to one's writing.  He calls upon us to realize that we are what we think.

Terminology

Discontinuity
Gebser cautioned against using terms like evolution, progression, or development to describe the changes in structures of consciousness that he described.

Gebser traces the evidence for the transformations of the structure of consciousness as they are concretized in historical artifacts. He sought to avoid calling this process "evolutionary", since any such notion was illusory when applied to the "unfolding of consciousness." Gebser emphasized that biological evolution is an enclosing process which particularizes a species to a limited environment. The unfolding of awareness is, by contrast, an opening-up.

Any attempt to give a direction or goal to the unfolding of awareness is illusory in that it is based upon a limited, mentalistic, linear notion of time. Gebser notes that "to progress" is to move toward something and is thus also to move away from something else; therefore, progress is an inappropriate term to describe the structures of consciousness. Gebser wrote that the question as to the fate of humanity is still open, that for it to become closed would be the ultimate tragedy, but that such a closure remains a possibility. To Gebser, our fate is not assured by any notion of "an evolution toward", or by any kind of ideal way of being.

Space and time
Gebser notes that the various structures of consciousness are revealed by their relationship to space and time. For example, the mythical structure embodies time as cyclical/rhythmic and space as enclosed. The mental structure lives time as linear, directed or "progressive" and space becomes the box-like, vacuum-like homogeneous space of geometry.

Influence
Gebser's work has formed the basis of a number of other studies and writers.

Ken Wilber
Ken Wilber referred to and quoted Gebser (along with many other theorists) in his 1981 Up from Eden and subsequent works. Wilber found Gebser's 'pioneering' work to align to his own model of consciousness, although Wilber finds evidence for additional later mystical stages beyond Gebser's integral structure.

William Irwin Thompson
In his 1996 Coming into Being, cultural critic William Irwin Thompson compared Gebser's structures of consciousness to Marshall McLuhan's conception of the development of communication technology from oral culture to script culture, alphabetic culture, print culture, and then to the emerging electronic culture. Thompson applied these insights to education theory in his 2001 Transforming History: A Curriculum for Cultural Evolution. In his 2004 Self and Society: Studies in the Evolution of Consciousness, and in collaboration with the mathematician Ralph Abraham, Thompson further related Gebser's structures to periods in the development of mathematics (arithmetic, geometric, algebraic, dynamical, chaotic) and in the history of music.

New Age
Gebser's integral philosophy is evaluated and applied to New Age thinking about a nascent shift in consciousness in the 2006 book 2012, The Return of Quetzalcoatl by Daniel Pinchbeck. In A Secret History of Consciousness (2003) cultural historian Gary Lachman links Gebser's work to that of other alternative philosophers of consciousness, such as Owen Barfield, Rudolf Steiner, Colin Wilson, and Jurij Moskvitin.

Other influences
Gebser's influence is also present in:
 Rudolf Bahro's Logik der Rettung (translated into English as Avoiding Social and Ecological Disaster),
 Bernardo Kastrup's Why Materialism Is Baloney
 Hugo Enomiya-Lassalle's Living in the New consciousness,
 Daniel Kealey's Revisioning Environmental Ethics,
 Georg Feuerstein's Wholeness or Transcendence,
 Eric Mark Kramer's Modern/Postmodern: Off the Beaten Path of Antimodernism,
Grant Maxwell's The Dynamics of Transformation: Tracing an Emerging World View.

Bibliography

English
 The Ever-Present Origin, authorized translation by Noel Barstad with Algis Mickunas (Athens: Ohio University Press, 1985, 1991)
 Anxiety, a Condition of Modern Man, (Visual series, 2) by Heiri Steiner and Jean Gebser (Paperback - 1962)

German
 Rilke und Spanien, 1936–1939
 Der grammatische Spiegel, 1944
 Ursprung und Gegenwart, 1949-1953
 Einbruch der Zeit, 1995

See also
 Perspective
 Spiral Dynamics
 Fowler's stages of faith development
 Integral Theory

Notes

References

Web-references

Sources

 
 
 
 
 
 
 {{Citation|last=Mickunas |first=Algis |year=1997 |title=An Introduction to the Philosophy of Jean Gebser. In: Integrative Investigations, January 1997, Volume 4 Number 1. Pages 8-21 |url=http://www.gebser.org/download/IEX/IEXvol4.pdf }}
 
 

Further reading

English
 Georg Feuerstein (1987), Structures of Consciousness: The Genius of Jean Gebser: An Introduction and Critique Georg Feuerstein (1989), Jean Gebser: What Color Is Your Consciousness Eric Mark Kramer (1992)Consciousness and Culture: An Introduction to the Thought of Jean Gebser (Contributions in Sociology)
 Eric Mark Kramer, Clark Callahan, S. David Zuckerman (2013). "Intercultural Communication and Global Integration"  Dubuque, IA: Kendall-Hunt

German
 Joachim Illies (1975), Adolf Portmann, Jean Gebser, Johann Jakob Bachofen: Drei Kulturforscher, drei Bilder vom Menschen (Texte, Thesen ; 67)
 Ursula Assing-Grosch (1993), Das schwierige Kind: Jean Gebsers Bewusstseinsphänomenologie in der kinder- und jugendpsychiatrischen Praxis (Reihe Psychologie)
 Elmar Schübl (2003), Jean Gebser (1905 - 1973)''

External links 
 
 
 The Jean Gebser Society
 Gebser Online
 An Overview of the work of Jean Gebser
 Allan Combs: Inner and Outer Realities: - Jean Gebser in a Cultural-Historical Perspective
 Steven Swanson, "The Integral and the Spiritual in Ken Wilber and Jean Gebser". The Journal of Yoga, September 2002 (pdf)
 Aaron Cheak, "From Poetry to Kulturphilosophie: A Philosophical Biography of Jean Gebser with Critical Translations"

1905 births
1973 deaths
Writers from Poznań
People from the Province of Posen
Stage theories
German emigrants to Switzerland
People from Bern